Kathleen Judith Rose (born 14 June 1937) is a British retired Anglican priests. She was one of the first female priests to hold a senior management role in the Church of England when she served as Archdeacon of Tonbridge from 1996 to 2002.

Biography
Rose was educated at Sexey's Grammar School, Seale-Hayne College and the London Bible College. She had earlier career in agriculture.

Rose became a parish worker at Rodbourne Cheney Parish Church, in 1976. She was made deaconess in 1976, and was ordained in the Church of England as a deacon in 1987 and as a priest in 1994.  She was at St George, Leeds from 1973 to 1981; chaplain at Bradford Cathedral from 1981 to 1985; minister at St Paul's Parkwood, Gillingham from 1986 to 1990; Rural Dean of Gillingham from 1988 to 1990; Chaplain to the Bishop of Rochester from 1990 to 1995; and Archdeacon of Tonbridge from 1996 to 2002.

Rose belongs to the evangelical wing of the Church of England.

Selected works
A published author, her works include:
 Sunday Learning for All Ages, 1982
 Women Priests: the first years, 1996
 Voices of this Calling, 2002
 Sow in Tears, 2007

References
 

1937 births
Living people
People educated at Sexey's Grammar School
Alumni of the London School of Theology
Archdeacons of Tonbridge
English agriculturalists
Evangelical Anglican clergy